The National Environmental Education Act of 1990 is an act of Congress of the United States of America to promote environmental education.

In this act, Congress found that "threats to human health and environmental quality are increasingly complex, involving a wide range of conventional and toxic contaminants in the air and water and on the land" and that "there is growing evidence of international environmental problems, such as global warming, ocean pollution, and declines in species diversity, and that these problems pose serious threats to human health and the environment on a global scale" and declared several other problems that need to be fixed or addressed by improving environmental education.

References
 US EPA - Environmental Education
  National Environmental Education Act of 1990 (US)

1990 in the environment
1990 in law
United States federal environmental legislation
Environmental education in the United States
United States federal legislation articles without infoboxes